Chestnuts Park is a park between the West Green, St. Ann's and Harringay neighbourhoods in the London Borough of Haringey.

It contains a café, community centre and tennis courts.

The park is protected in perpetuity as a site for public recreation with Fields in Trust,  as part of the Queen Elizabeth II Fields Challenge scheme, and it received the Green Flag Award in May 2008.

References

Parks and open spaces in the London Borough of Haringey